Chanchal Kumar Majumdar (11 August 1938 – 20 June 2000) was an Indian condensed matter physicist and the founder director of S.N. Bose National Centre for Basic Sciences. Known for his research in quantum mechanics, Majumdar was an elected fellow of all the three major Indian science academies – the Indian National Science Academy, the National Academy of Sciences, India, and the Indian Academy of Sciences – as well a member of the New York Academy of Sciences and the American Physical Society.

Majumdar was the mentor of Dipan Ghosh with whom he co-developed the Majumdar–Ghosh model, an extension of the Heisenberg model which improved upon the latter, and was a protege of Walter Kohn and Maria Goeppert-Mayer, both Nobel laureates. The Council of Scientific and Industrial Research, the apex agency of the Government of India for scientific research, awarded him the Shanti Swarup Bhatnagar Prize for Science and Technology, one of the highest Indian science awards, for his contributions to Physical Sciences in 1976.

Biography 

C. K. Majumdar was born on 11 August 1938 in Krishnanagar in Bengal of the British India to Sita and Nirmal Kanti Majumdar, a political science professor, as one of their three sons. He and his brothers, Ujjal and Mukul, did well in their studies. He did his schooling at C.M.S St. John's High School in Krishnanagar and completed his early college education in Calcutta at Presidency College and the Rajabazar Science College, University of Calcutta.

After undertaking postgraduate research at the Saha Institute of Nuclear Physics during 1960–61, he enrolled at the University of California, San Diego and worked at the laboratory of Walter Kohn, who would go on to receive a Nobel Prize in Chemistry in 1998; Kohn was his thesis supervisor and their relationship lasted Majumdar's lifetime. Majumdar's research on the effect of interactions on positron annihilation in solids guided by Maria Goeppert-Mayer, who had won the Nobel Prize for Physics in 1963, earned him a PhD in 1965, and he did his post-doctoral work at Carnegie Mellon University (then known as Carnegie Institute of Technology) while continuing his work with Kohn for a while.

On his return to India in 1966, Majumdar joined the Tata Institute of Fundamental Research as an associate professor, where he stayed until his move to University of Calcutta in 1975. In between, he had a short stint at the University of Manchester in 1969–70, working alongside Sam Edwards.

At Calcutta University, Majumdar served as the Palit Professor of Physics at the University College of Science, Technology & Agriculture, and as the head of the department of magnetism and solid state physics of the Indian Association for the Cultivation of Science (IACS), carrying out his research at the Palit Laboratory of IACS and at the Variable Energy Cyclotron Centre. When the Department of Science and Technology established the S.N. Bose National Centre for Basic Sciences (SNBNCBS), an autonomous institute for basic research in mathematics, Majumdar was appointed as its first director in 1987. Following a decade of service at SNBNCBS, he retired from official service in 1999.

After retirement from regular service, Majumdar served as a senior scientist of the Indian National Science Academy at the Indian Statistical Institute, but his stint there was short-lived. He succumbed to a heart attack on 20 June 2000 in Kolkata, aged 61. He was survived by his wife, Utpala Ghosh, whom he had married soon after his return from the US in 1968, and their two children, Ruchira and Rupak.

Legacy 

A major turning point in Majumdar's career came during his doctoral work with Walter Kohn in the early 1960s. The Austrian-born American scientist had already been known in the scientific world for his development of the Luttinger–Kohn model (he would later win the 1998 Nobel Prize for chemistry), and his association with Majumdar resulted in the development of the Kohn-Majumdar theorem, which explained the continuity in a Fermi gas in relation to its bound and unbound states. They described the theorem in an article, Continuity between Bound and Unbound States in a Fermi Gas, published in Physical Review in 1965.

Later, during his days at TIFR, Majumdar guided Dipan Ghosh on Magnetic Hamiltonians for the latter's doctoral studies. Together they developed the Majumdar–Ghosh model, an extension of the Heisenberg model, which serves as a stepping stone to a broader understanding of complex spin models. The model is detailed in their article On Next‐Nearest‐Neighbor Interaction in Linear Chain, I, published in the Journal of Mathematical Physics in 1969. A year later, Majumdar worked on non-Debye stress relaxation of glassy systems along with Samuel Edwards, which also resulted in the publication of a notable article. Subsequently, he developed methods for calculating effective magnetic moment and physical quantities such as specific heat of finite Heisenberg chains; his work proved that violation of the rules related to non-degeneracy and avoided crossing existed.

Majumdar used scattering theory techniques to study bound magnon states, and his findings have since been experimentally verified. He modified the work of Michael R. Douglas and Sam Edwards on soda-lime glass and proposed a simpler explanation for its time-dependent stress relaxation and a formula to assess long time scales with regard to its order of magnitude. Some of his other achievements include the calculation of critical isotherm of Lennard-Jones gas, the Mössbauer effect determination of the Fe(II) and Fe(III) ratio, the determination of critical parameters of gas-liquid phase transition, the Ising model of ferromagnetism, and the development of a theoretical method for measuring the Fermi momentum of metals.

His studies have been documented by way of a number of articles and the article repository of the Indian Academy of Sciences has listed 45 of them. Majumdar also published two books, Annihilation of Positrons in Metals and S N Bose: The Man and His Work, and contributed chapters to books published by others.

On the academic front, Majumdar was instrumental in modernising the physics laboratories at Calcutta University. He was associated with a number of national and international agencies; he was a member of the Indian National Commission for Cooperation with UNESCO and the Indo-US Subcommission in Physics. He sat on the Physics panel of the University Grants Commission as well as the commission on higher education in West Bengal. He served as a member of the advisory committees on Physics of the Department of Science and Technology and the Council of Scientific and Industrial Research. He was the editor of the Indian Journal of Physics and was a member of the editorial board of the Pramana journal. He was associated with the conference on Observational Evidence for Black Holes in the Universe held in Kolkata in 1998 as a member of its scientific advisory committee. He was the president of the Indian Physical Society (1988–90) and the Indian Centre for Space Physics (1999–2000), and served as an executive council member of the Raman Centre for Applied and Interdisciplinary Sciences.

Controversy 
Towards the end of his career at S. N. Bose Centre, he faced allegations of misappropriation of funds. His mentor, Walter Kohn, later argued that the allegations stemmed from Majumdar's troubled relationship with the trade unions of the Communist Party of India when the state was run by a Left Front government led by Jyoti Basu.

Awards and honours 
The Council of Scientific and Industrial Research awarded Majumdar the Shanti Swarup Bhatnagar Prize, one of the highest Indian science awards, in 1976. The same year, he was elected a Fellow of the Indian Academy of Sciences. He received the M. N. Saha Medal of the Asiatic Society in 1978 and was selected as a National Lecturer by University Grants Commission (UGC) the same year; the P. A. Pandya Award of the Indian Physics Association reached him a year later. In 1982, the Indian National Science Academy (INSA) elected him as a Fellow, and in 1983 the UGC honoured him again with the Meghnad Saha Award for Research in Theoretical Sciences. He received another honour from INSA by way of the Satyendranath Bose Medal in 1989. He became an elected fellow of the American Physical Society and delivered the Santanu Ghosh Memorial Lecture of the Indian Science News Association, Calcutta, both honours coming in 1991. The Indian Science Congress Association awarded him the Satyendranath Bose Birth Centenary Award in 1997. He was also a fellow of the National Academy of Sciences, India, Indian Physical Society and the New York Academy of Sciences.

The Indian Association for the Cultivation of Science has instituted an annual oration, C. K. Majumdar Memorial Lecture, in his honour; the inaugural lecture was delivered by Walter Kohn. Past speakers of the lecture include notable names such as Michael Berry, David Logan, Peter Littlewood, Narasimhaiengar Mukunda, Jainendra K. Jain, and Daniel I. Khomskii. An issue of Physics Letters B in 2000, the year of his death, was published as a festschrift on him.

To commemorate his 60th birthday, an international conference on statistical physics, Statphys – Calcutta III, was held at S. N. Bose Centre in January 1999. A year after his death, the Indian Statistical Institute organised a Workshop on Strongly Correlated Electron Systems to honour his memory.

Selected bibliography

Books

Chapters

Articles

See also 

 Fermi gas
 Faddeev equations
 Satyendra Nath Bose
 Indrani Bose

Notes

References

Further reading 
 

1938 births
2000 deaths
Scientists from Kolkata
Bengali scientists
Indian quantum physicists
Indian scientific authors
Indian technology writers
Presidency University, Kolkata alumni
University of Calcutta alumni
University of California, San Diego alumni
Carnegie Mellon University alumni
Academic staff of Tata Institute of Fundamental Research
Academic staff of the University of Calcutta
Alumni of the University of Manchester
Academic staff of the Indian Statistical Institute
Recipients of the Shanti Swarup Bhatnagar Award in Medical Science
Fellows of the Indian Academy of Sciences
Fellows of the Indian National Science Academy
Fellows of The National Academy of Sciences, India
Fellows of the American Physical Society
20th-century Indian physicists
Indian condensed matter physicists